Enkhaba is a town in northwest Eswatini. It is located on the MR1 route to the north of Mbabane, between the towns of Piggs Peak and Motjane.

References
Fitzpatrick, M., Blond, B., Pitcher, G., Richmond, S., and Warren, M. (2004)  South Africa, Lesotho and Swaziland. Footscray, VIC: Lonely Planet.

Populated places in Eswatini